Howick Pakuranga Cricket Club (inc.) is a cricket club in east Auckland, New Zealand. It was formed in and is located at Lloyd Elsmore Park.

Men's Cricket

International Honours
Kyle Mills
Colin de Grandhomme
Brooke Walker
Kerry Walmsley
Dion Nash
Blair Pocock
Andy McKay
Mitchell McClenaghan
Colin Munro

Domestic Honours
Andrew de Boorder
Derek de Boorder
Greg Morgan
Gareth Hayne
Nigel Scott

Women's Cricket

International Honours
Rebecca Rolls

References

Auckland cricket clubs